is a railway station in Minami-ku, Hiroshima, Hiroshima Prefecture, Japan, operated by West Japan Railway Company (JR West).

Lines
Tenjingawa Station is served by the Sanyō Main Line and the Kure Line.

History 
Tenjingawa station opened on 13 March 2004.

See also
 List of railway stations in Japan

References

External links

  

Railway stations in Hiroshima Prefecture
Stations of West Japan Railway Company in Hiroshima city
Sanyō Main Line
Railway stations in Japan opened in 2004